Bharatpur District is a district in Rajasthan state in western India. The city of Bharatpur is the District Headquarters, Division Headquarters and Headquarters of  Bharatpur Police Range of Rajasthan Police. Bharatpur District is a part of National Capital Region of India Delhi.

History

The area in later medieval times was ruled by the Sinsinwar clan of the Hindu Jats. In 1733 AD, Maharaja Suraj Mal built the city of Bharatpur. It is believed that it was a well-fortified city under his rule. Bharatpur was carved out from Mewat and got its name from Lord Bharat (Lord Rama's brother).

Geography
Bharatpur, also known as ‘Eastern Gate of Rajasthan’, is located in the Braj region 180 km away from Delhi. Geographically, the district is situated between 26° 22' and 27° 83' N and 76° 53' and 78° 17' E and its average height above sea level is around 183 m. Bharatpur city is the district headquarters and is also known by the name of Lohagarh. It is situated very close to the main cities of Rajasthan and other states. Distance between Jaipur and Bharatpur is around 178 km whereas Agra lies at a distance of 55 km from the district. Mathura is located at a distance of 34 km. Bharatpur touches Gurgaon of Haryana in the north, Mathura in the east, Agra of Uttar Pradesh and Dholpur of Rajasthan in the south and Dausa and Alwar in the west.

There are only three main seasonal rivers in this District, namely Ban Ganga, Rooparel and Gambhir. Ban Ganga starts from Ramgarh Dam of Jaipur district , passes from Bharatpur and meets in river Gambhir near tehsil Bayana of District Bharatpur. Gambhir river starts from Panchna Dam of district Karauli and after passing from Bharatpur meets River Yamuna in Uttar Pradesh. Rooparel River starts from hills of district Alwar and enters into Bharatpur from tehsil Kaman. Instead of this, a Dam, namely, Bandh Baretha is situated near the village Baretha on river Kakund which starts from the hills of district Karauli. The water of this dam is used for drinking and irrigation purpose for this district. The capacity of this dam is 684.00 million cubic feet (29 Gaze feet).

Divisions
Bharatpur District has ten revenue subdivisions and twelve tehsils. They have the same names and borders, except that Weir Subdivision is divided into Weir  and Bhusawar. The other ten tehsils are: Bayana, Bharatpur, Deeg, Kaman, Kumher, Nadbai, Nagar, Pahari,
Sikri, Uchchain   and Roopwas (Rupbas).

Demographics

In the 2011 census, the Bharatpur District had a population of 2,548,462, roughly equal to the nation of Kuwait or the US state of Nevada. This gave it a ranking of 166th among districts of India (out of a total of 640). Its population growth rate over the decade 2001-2011 was 21.32%. Bharatpur had a sex ratio of 877 females for every 1000 males, and a literacy rate of 71.16%. 19.43% of the population lives in urban areas. Scheduled Castes and Scheduled Tribes make up 21.87% and 2.12% of the population respectively.

Languages 

At the time of the 2011 census, 63.63% of the population spoke Hindi, 29.33% Braj and 5.00% Mewati as their first language. The dialects of the region are Mewati and Braj. Mewati is the language in the northern parts of the district, which come under the Mewat region. The dialect transitions towards Braj in the east and south. Most speakers of these dialects record their language generically as Hindi in the census.

Trade and Commerce

Industrial Areas
Bharatpur District has been divided in six industrial areas:
 Old Industrial Area Bharatpur
 Brij Industrial Area Bharatpur
 Industrial Area Bayana
 Industrial Area Deeg
 Industrial Area Jurhera
 I.I.D. Center Bayana

Oil Industries

Bharatpur district is known not only for agriculture production but also known for oil industries. Mustard seeds and other agriculture products come to the market through mandies established by Krishi Upaj Mandi Samiti and transported all over the country. These Krishi Upaj Mandies are in Bharatpur, Nadbai, Weir, Deeg, Kaman, Bayana, Roopwas and Bhusawar.

There are total 554 oil mills registered in which 2317 persons are employed and Rs. 2690.84 lacs was invested. Out of these mills 78 are big units having AGMARK and rest are small oil expeller units.

Other
In some areas of Bharatpur District like- Hindaun & Karauli etc. stone quarrying is also practised. Many of nearby State's Forts like The Red Fort of Delhi, Agra Fort, and Fatehpur Sikari were built using local stone.

Culture

Historical Events

Bharatpur is believed to be a place of mythological importance. It is believed that the Pandavas had spent their 13th year of exile at this place around 3,500 years ago. Archaeologists have found many ancient specimens  which are presently kept in the Bharatpur museum.

Festivals
One of the most important festivals of Bharatpur is the Braj Festival which takes place in Bharatpur every year before Holi. The festival is dedicated to Lord Krishna who had spent his childhood in the Braj region. The festival displays the Indian culture and rich mythology of the Indian society.  Also famous by the name of Braj Mahotsava, the festival lasts for three days in the Shukl Paksh in the month of Phalgun according to the Hindu calendar. Rasleela is organised on the occasion of this festival. Folk songs are sung by the local singers and the whole town is decorated with colours.
Gangaur, Teej are another important festival of Rajasthan.Ladies wear new clothes and adorn themselves with jewellery during these festivals. They gather at a common place and pray to the goddess. Females swing to welcome ‘Saawan’. ‘Ghevar’ and ‘Pheeni’ are the sweets of the occasion. Jaswant exhibition is held in the months of September- October during Dussehra celebrations every year.

Notable residents
Maharaja Suraj Mal (February 1707 – 25 December 1763) was Jat ruler of Bharatpur
Acharya Rajendrasuri (1826–1906), Jain reformer was born in Bharatpur.
Natwar Singh (born 1931), ex-Foreign Minister
Jagannath Pahadia (1932–2021), Chief Minister of Rajasthan and Governor of Haryana.

Transport
The nearest airport is situated at Agra, which is 56-km from Bharatpur. Delhi is 184 Km from Bharatpur. Regular rail services connect Bharatpur with all the major cities such as Delhi, Mumbai, Jaipur and Agra. The Bharatpur railway station is about 5 Km from the park/bird sanctuary.

References

External links

 
 Bharatpur History
 

 
Districts of Rajasthan
Districts in Bharatpur division